"Broke Away" is the second single from Scottish band Wet Wet Wet's third studio album, Holding Back the River. It was released on 27 November 1989, entering the charts at number 39 the following Sunday. It peaked four weeks later at number 19.

Track listings
 CD and 12-inch (calendar pack)
 "Broke Away" – 4:01
 "You've Had It" (Louis Silas Club Mix) – 7:02
 "Sweet Surrender" (Ben Liebrand Club Mix) – 6:51

 7-inch and cassette
 "Broke Away" – 4:01
 "You've Had It" (Louis Silas Club Mix) – 7:02

 7-inch picture disc and 12-inch
 "Broke Away" – 4:03
 "You've Had It" (Louis Silas Club Edit) – 3:53
 "And Now for Something Completely Different" – 2:43

References

Wet Wet Wet songs
1989 singles
1989 songs
Mercury Records singles
Songs written by Graeme Clark (musician)
Songs written by Marti Pellow
Songs written by Neil Mitchell (musician)
Songs written by Tommy Cunningham